Aplasta is a monotypic moth genus in the family Geometridae erected by Jacob Hübner in 1823. Its only species, Aplasta ononaria, the rest harrow, was first described by Johann Kaspar Füssli in 1783. It is found in southern Europe to Anatolia and from England to the Baltic states.

The wingspan is 26–31 mm. The length of the forewings 13–14 mm. The moth flies from June to September depending on the location.

The larvae feed on Ononis.

References

External links

Rest harrow at UKMoths
Lepiforum e.V.
 De Vlinderstichting 

Geometridae genera
Moths described in 1783
Pseudoterpnini
Moths of Europe
Moths of Asia
Taxa named by Johann Kaspar Füssli
Monotypic moth genera